Laneuville-à-Rémy is a commune in the Haute-Marne department in north-eastern France. Between 1972 and 2012 it was part of the commune Robert-Magny-Laneuville-à-Rémy.

See also
Communes of the Haute-Marne department

References

Communes of Haute-Marne